This page gathers the results of elections in Lombardy.

Regional elections

Latest regional election

In the latest regional election, which took place on 12–13 February 2023, Attilio Fontana (Lega Lombarda–Lega) was re-elected President of Lombardy with the support of centre-right coalition.

List of previous regional elections
1970 Lombard regional election
1975 Lombard regional election
1980 Lombard regional election
1985 Lombard regional election
1990 Lombard regional election
1995 Lombard regional election
2000 Lombard regional election
2005 Lombard regional election
2010 Lombard regional election
2013 Lombard regional election
2018 Lombard regional election

Italian general elections in Lombardy

Latest general election

List of previous general elections
1946 Italian general election in Lombardy
1948 Italian general election in Lombardy
1953 Italian general election in Lombardy
1958 Italian general election in Lombardy
1963 Italian general election in Lombardy
1968 Italian general election in Lombardy
1972 Italian general election in Lombardy
1976 Italian general election in Lombardy
1979 Italian general election in Lombardy
1983 Italian general election in Lombardy
1987 Italian general election in Lombardy
1992 Italian general election in Lombardy
1994 Italian general election in Lombardy
1996 Italian general election in Lombardy
2001 Italian general election in Lombardy
2006 Italian general election in Lombardy
2008 Italian general election in Lombardy
2013 Italian general election in Lombardy

European Parliament elections in Lombardy

Latest European Parliament election

List of previous European Parliament elections
1979 European Parliament election in Lombardy
1984 European Parliament election in Lombardy
1989 European Parliament election in Lombardy
1994 European Parliament election in Lombardy
1999 European Parliament election in Lombardy
2004 European Parliament election in Lombardy
2009 European Parliament election in Lombardy
2014 European Parliament election in Lombardy

Provincial elections in Lombardy

References

 
Politics of Lombardy